175 Andromache (minor planet designation: 175 Andromache) is a main-belt asteroid that was discovered by Canadian-American astronomer J. C. Watson on October 1, 1877, and named after Andromache, wife of Hector during the Trojan War. Watson's telegram to Europe announcing the discovery became lost, and so notification did not arrive until several weeks later. As a result, another minor planet, later designated 176 Iduna, was initially assigned the number 175.

The initial orbital elements for 175 Andromache proved unreliable, and it was only in 1893 that an accurate ephemeris was produced. Because the orbital period is fairly close to being double that of the giant planet Jupiter, 175 Andromache initially became of interest in the study of gravitational perturbations.

Based upon its spectrum, this is classified as a C-type asteroid. It has a diameter estimated in the range 101–107 km with a roughly circular shape. The size ratio between the major and minor axes is 1.09 ± 0.09, as determined from the W. M. Keck Observatory. An earlier result published in 2000 gave a larger size ratio of 1.20.

References

External links
 
 

Background asteroids
Andromache
Andromache
C-type asteroids (Tholen)
Cg-type asteroids (SMASS)
18771001